Meesai Murugesan (13 January 1930 - 8 November 2014) was a veteran actor and musician who appeared in Tamil films. He starred in more than 100 films and has done supporting roles in various films.

Music career
He started his career by playing the 'Kottankuchi' (coconut shell), alongside great musicians like K. P. Sundarambal, M. K. T. Bhagavathar, T. M. Soundararajan and Seerkazhi Govindarajan. He was popular for creating shrill sound effects in Nenjam Marappathillai and footfall of the horse in "Rajavin Paarvai Raniyin Pakkam" song in MGR-Saroja Devi's Anbe Vaa. He has played instruments for music directors like M. S. Viswanathan, Ilayaraja and Kunnakudi Vaidyanathan.

He was a carnatic artist and had learned to play over 25 instruments. He also ran a one-man band "Apoorva Thalavaithiyangal" and held several concerts across the world including Europe, Canada, the United States and Russia.

Film career
His career spans over 100 films and he is famous for his roles in Vijay's Poove Unakkaga, Kamal Haasan's Unnal Mudiyum Thambi, Sathyaraj's Amaidhi Padai, Pandiarajan's Aan Paavam and much more. He earned the name "Meesai Murugesan" after sported a thick moustache in his first film Sugamana Raagangal.

Awards
He was conferred Kalaimamani by the Tamil Nadu State government for his contribution to the cinema.

Partial filmography

Death
He died due to ill health and blood clots in his brain on 8 November 2014. He was 84 years of age and is survived by his wife, a son and two daughters.

References

External links 
 

Male actors in Tamil cinema
Indian male film actors
1930 births
2014 deaths